The Battle of Croix-des-Bouquets took place during the Haitian Revolution.

Battle 
Chased from Port-au-Prince, the army of Mulattoes and free colored people commanded by Beauvais and Rigaud reformed at La Croix-des-Bouquets. The arrival of this troop caused an uprising of slaves of the Plain of the Cul-de-Sac. They were armed only with knives, spears, hoes, and iron poles, and their chief was Yacinth, who was only 21 years old. The insurgent slaves joined the army of Beauvais and Rigaud.

The whites decided to attack this rally on March 22, the infantrymen and dragoons of the National Guard of Port-au-Prince reinforced by detachments of the Regiment of Normandy and the Regiment of Artois went to meet the insurgents. The fight began at La Croix-des-Bouquets.

The French writer Victor Schœlcher of the nineteenth century, in his book Vie de Toussaint Louverture described this episode: "The black brought by Yacinthe, almost all Africans, were scarcely armed with knives, pikes, hoes, and iron poles; but fanaticized by their wizards, convinced that they would be resurrected in Africa if they were killed, they threw themselves on the bayonets without caring for the fires of platoons which decimated them. They clung to the horses of the dragoons they dismounted by being slashed. Yacinthe, with a bull's tail in her hand, roamed their ranks, shouting that she was chasing death. He rushed to their heads, fighting bullets and grape shots, which seemed to respect his talisman. Men were seen rushing on the guns, holding them hugged to prevent them from leaving and being killed without letting go. Others were found thrusting their arms into the mouths of the pieces to tear out the balls and call their comrades, shouting: Come, come; we hold them. The pieces were leaving and their members were carried away".

Exceeded by numbers, the whites had to retreat and folded in disorder on Port-au-Prince, according to Victor Schoelcher who relies on the writings of Thomas Madiou and François Joseph Pamphile de Lacroix, the White lost more than 100 soldiers and insurgents lost 1,200.

Notes

Bibliography 
 
 
 

Conflicts in 1792
Croix-des-Bouquets
Croix-des-Bouquets
Haitian Revolution
1792 in France
1792 in North America